Gruppenbach is a river of Baden-Württemberg, Germany. It flows into the Bühler near Bühlerzell.

See also
List of rivers of Baden-Württemberg

Rivers of Baden-Württemberg
Ellwangen Hills
Rivers of Germany